Rhett Gordon (born August 26, 1976) is a Canadian retired professional ice hockey forward who predominantly played his career in Europe, winning the Elite Ice Hockey League title in his last season with the Nottingham Panthers.

Career statistics

References

External links

1976 births
Living people
Augsburger Panther players
Ayr Scottish Eagles players
Bolzano HC players
Canadian expatriate ice hockey players in the United States
Canadian ice hockey right wingers
Colorado Eagles players
Ice hockey people from Saskatchewan
Iserlohn Roosters players
Kansas City Blades players
Manitoba Moose (IHL) players
Nottingham Panthers players
Regina Pats players
Rødovre Mighty Bulls players
Sheffield Steelers players
Sportspeople from Regina, Saskatchewan
Springfield Falcons players
Canadian expatriate ice hockey players in England
Canadian expatriate ice hockey players in Scotland
Canadian expatriate ice hockey players in Denmark
Canadian expatriate ice hockey players in Germany
Canadian expatriate ice hockey players in Italy